Flypaper is a fly-killing device.

Flypaper may also refer to:

 Flypaper (1997 film), an American crime film starring Craig Sheffer and Robert Loggia
 Flypaper (2011 film), an American crime comedy film starring Patrick Dempsey and Ashley Judd
 "The Flypaper", an episode of Tales of the Unexpected based on a short story by Elizabeth Taylor

See also 
 Flypaper effect, an economic assertion that "money sticks where it hits"
 Flypaper theory (disambiguation)